Folorunso Ifeyinka "Foley" Fatukasi (born March 4, 1995) is an American football defensive end for the Jacksonville Jaguars of the National Football League (NFL). He played college football at UConn.

College career 
In 2015, Fatukasi was named as an honorable mention on the 2015 All-American Athletic Conference football team.

Professional career

New York Jets
Fatukasi was drafted by the New York Jets in the sixth round (180th overall) of the 2018 NFL Draft.

Fatukasi was placed on the reserve/COVID-19 list by the team on December 17, 2020, and activated on December 22.

Jacksonville Jaguars
On March 16, 2022, Fatukasi signed a three-year, $30 million contract with the Jacksonville Jaguars.

Personal life
Fatukasi is of Nigerian descent. His brother Olakunle Fatukasi is a linebacker for the New England Patriots.

References

External links 
UConn Huskies bio 

Living people
1995 births
American sportspeople of Nigerian descent
People from Far Rockaway, Queens
Sportspeople from Queens, New York
Players of American football from New York City
American football defensive tackles
UConn Huskies football players
New York Jets players
Beach Channel High School alumni
Jacksonville Jaguars players